The Iraq national basketball team represents Iraq in international basketball competitions. It is one out of only two Arab nations to ever qualify for the Men's Basketball Tournament at the Summer Olympics. (the other nation being Egypt)

Competitive record

Olympic Games

The Iraqi Basketball team at the 1948 Olympic Games in London:

Ahmed Hamed, Emile Yousef, George Hanna, Hashim Abdul-Jalil, 
Irfan Abdul-Kadir, Kanan Aoni, Salih Faraj, Salman Mahdi Deheh, Salman Ali Daleh, Wadud Khalil Jumaa

FIBA Asia Cup

Asian Games

West Asian Championship

Pan Arab Games

Team

Current roster

2021 FIBA Asia Cup qualification
Due to the COVID-19 pandemic, the FIBA Executive Committee decided that for the 2020 November window games will be held at a single venue under a bubble format.

Venue: Khalifa Sport City, Manama

Opposition: Bahrain  (November 28)
Opposition: Lebanon  (November 30)

Past roster
2021 FIBA Asia Cup qualification
Opposition: Lebanon (February 21)
Venue: Nouhad Nawfal Sports Complex, Zouk Mikael
Opposition: India (February 24)
Venue: Al Shaab Hall, Baghdad

Roster for the 2017 FIBA Asia Cup.

Head coach position
 Fikrat Toma – 2002–2004, 2010–2013
 Manuel Povea – 2014–2015
 Srđan Antić – 2016
 Atila Abdulaziz – 2017
 Mustafa Derin – 2017
 Khalid Deroish – 2020 
/ Aziz Bekir – 2020–present

See also
Iraq women's national basketball team
Iraq national under-19 basketball team
Iraq national under-17 basketball team
Iraq national 3x3 team

References

External links
FIBA profile

Videos
Iraq v China - Quarter Final Highlights - FIBA Asia Challenge 2016 - youtube.com video

Men's national basketball teams
Basketball
Basketball teams in Iraq
1948 establishments in Iraq
Basketball teams established in 1948